Charles IV (Carlos Antonio Pascual Francisco Javier Juan Nepomuceno José Januario Serafín Diego de Borbón y Sajonia; 11 November 1748 – 20 January 1819) was King of Spain and ruler of the Spanish Empire from 1788 to 1808.

The Spain inherited by Charles IV gave few indications of instability, but during his reign, Spain entered a series of disadvantageous alliances and his regime constantly sought cash to deal with the exigencies of war. He detested his son and heir Ferdinand, who led the unsuccessful El Escorial Conspiracy and later forced Charles's abdication after the Tumult of Aranjuez in March 1808, along with the ouster of his widely hated first minister Manuel de Godoy. Summoned to Bayonne by Napoleon Bonaparte, who forced Ferdinand VII to abdicate, Charles IV also abdicated, paving the way for Napoleon to place his older brother Joseph Bonaparte on the throne of Spain. The reign of Charles IV turned out to be a major turning point in Spanish history.

Early life
Charles was the second son of Charles III and his wife, Maria Amalia of Saxony. He was born in Naples (11 November 1748), while his father was King of Naples and Sicily. His elder brother, Don Felipe, was passed over for both thrones, due to his learning disabilities and epilepsy. In Naples and Sicily, Charles was referred to as the Prince of Taranto. He was called  (meaning "the Hunter"), due to his preference for sport and hunting, rather than dealing with affairs of the state. Charles is considered by historian Stanley G. Payne as "good-hearted but weak and simple-minded."
On 18 November 1791, King Carlos IV promulgated a royal decree declaring the foundation of the "Royal University of Guadalajara". in modern times University of Guadalajara.

Reign

In 1788, Charles III died and Charles IV succeeded to the throne and ruled for the next two decades. Even though he had a profound belief in the sanctity of the monarchy and kept up the appearance of an absolute, powerful king, Charles never took more than a passive part in his own government. The affairs of government were left to his wife, Maria Luisa, and the man he appointed first minister, Manuel de Godoy. Charles occupied himself with hunting in the period that saw the outbreak of the French Revolution, the executions of his Bourbon relative Louis XVI of France and his queen, Marie Antoinette, and the rise of Napoleon Bonaparte. Ideas of the Age of Enlightenment had come to Spain with the accession of the first Spanish Bourbon, Philip V. Charles' father, Charles III, had pursued an active policy of reform that sought to reinvigorate Spain politically and economically and make the Spanish Empire more closely an appendage of the metropole. Charles III was an active, working monarch with experienced first ministers to help reach decisions.  Charles IV, by contrast, was a do-nothing king, with a domineering wife and an inexperienced but ambitious first minister, Godoy. The combination of a king not up to the task of governance, the queen widely perceived to take lovers (including Godoy) and the first minister with an agenda of his own earned the monarchy increased alienation from its subjects.

Upon ascending to the throne, Charles IV intended to maintain the policies of his father and, accordingly, retained his prime minister, the Count of Floridablanca. Floridablanca avoided war with Great Britain in the Nootka Sound crisis, where a minor trade and navigation dispute off the west coast of Vancouver Island in 1789 could have blown up into a major conflict. Spain could have drawn on its French ally in support against Britain but they refused. In a humiliating move Floridablanca had no choice but to capitulate to British terms and thereby negotiated with them.  In 1792, political and personal enemies ousted Floridablanca from office, replacing him with the Count of Aranda. However, in the wake of the war against Republican France, the liberal-leaning Count of Aranda was himself replaced by Manuel de Godoy, a favorite of the Queen and widely believed to be her lover, who enjoyed the lasting favor of the King.

Under Charles IV, scientific expeditions continued to be sent by the crown, some of which were initially authorized by Charles III. The Royal Botanical Expedition to New Granada (1783–1816), and the Royal Botanical Expedition to New Spain (1787–1803), were funded by the crown. The Malaspina Expedition (1789–94) was an important scientific expedition headed by Spanish naval commander Alejandro Malaspina, with naturalists and botanical illustrators gathering information for the Spanish crown.<ref>Juan Pimentel, La física de la monarquía. Ciencia y política en el pensamiento colonial de Alejandro Malaspina (1754–1810). Madrid: Doce Calles 1998.</ref> 
In 1803, he authorized the Balmis Expedition, aimed at vaccinating Spain's overseas territories against smallpox but also to make it safe for Atlantic societies to continue traffic slaves without the risk of a small pox epidemic on board. 
In 1799, Charles IV authorized Prussian aristocrat and scientist Alexander von Humboldt to travel freely in Spanish America, with royal officials encouraged to aid him in his investigation of key areas of Spain's empire. Humboldt's Political Essay on the Kingdom of New Spain was a key publication from his five-year travels.

Spain's economic problems were of long standing, but deteriorated further when Spain was ensnared in wars that its ally France pursued. Financial needs drove his domestic and foreign policy. Godoy's economic policies increased discontent with Charles's regime.  In an attempt to implement major economic changes, Gaspar Melchor de Jovellanos, a reformist, Jansenist conservative proposed major structural reform of land tenure to promote the revival of agriculture.  His 1795 work, Informe en el expediente de ley agraria argued that Spain needed thriving agriculture to allow its population to grow and prosper. In his analysis, the concentration of land ownership and traditions and institutional barriers were at the heart of agriculture's problems.  He called for division and sale of public lands, which were held by villages, as well as the swaths of Spanish territory controlled by the Mesta, the organization of livestock owners who had kept grazing lands as an asset for their use. Jovellanos also argued for the abolition of entailed properties (mayorazgos), which allowed landed estates to pass undivided through generations of aristocrats, as well as sale of lands held by the Catholic Church. The aim of these policies was to create in Spain yeoman farmers, who would pursue their self-interest and make agricultural land more productive. The cost would be to undermine the power of the Church and the aristocracy.

As the situation with immediate revenue became more fraught, the crown in 1804 imposed measures in its overseas empire forcing the church to call in immediately the mortgages it had extended on a long-term by the Catholic Church. Although aimed at undermining the wealth and power of the church, the wealthy landowning elites were faced with financial ruin, since they had no way to make full payment on their mortgaged properties. This ill-considered royal decree has been seen as a major factor in the independence movement in New Spain (Mexico). The decree was in abeyance once Charles and Ferdinand abdicated, but it undermined elite support while in force.

In foreign policy Godoy continued Abarca de Bolea's policy of neutrality toward as France, but after Spain protested the execution of Louis XVI of France in 1793, France declared war on Spain. After the declaration, Portugal and Spain signed a treaty of mutual protection against France. In 1796 France forced Godoy to enter into an alliance, and declare war on the Kingdom of Great Britain. As a consequence, Spain became one of the maritime empires to have been allied with Republican France in the French Revolutionary War, and for a considerable duration.

Spain remained an ally of France for a while, lost against the British in the battle of Trafalgar, and supported the Continental Blockade. After Napoleon's victory over Prussia in 1807, Godoy kept Spain  with the French side. 

But the switching of alliances devalued Charles's position as a trustworthy ally, increasing Godoy's unpopularity, and strengthening the fernandistas (supporters of Crown Prince Ferdinand), who favoured an alliance with the United Kingdom.

Economic troubles, rumors about a sexual relationship between the Queen and Godoy, and the King's ineptitude, caused the monarchy to decline in prestige among the population. Anxious to take over from his father, and jealous of the prime minister, Crown Prince Ferdinand attempted to overthrow the King in an aborted coup in 1807. He was successful in 1808, forcing his father's abdication following the Tumult of Aranjuez.

 Abdications of Bayonne 

Riots, and a popular revolt at the winter palace Aranjuez, in 1808 forced the king to abdicate on 19 March, in favor of his son. Ferdinand took the throne as Ferdinand VII, but was mistrusted by Napoleon, who had 100,000 soldiers stationed in Spain by that time due to the ongoing War of the Third Coalition.

The ousted King, having appealed to Napoleon for help in regaining his throne, was summoned before Napoleon in Bayonne, along with his son, in April 1808. Napoleon forced both Charles and his son to abdicate, declared the Bourbon dynasty of Spain deposed, and installed his brother, Joseph Bonaparte, as King Joseph I of Spain, which began the Peninsular War.

Later life and death

Following Napoleon's deposing of the Bourbon dynasty, the ex-King, his wife, and former Prime Minister Godoy were held captive in France first at the château de Compiègne and three years in Marseille (where a neighborhood was named after him). After the collapse of the regime installed by Napoleon, Ferdinand VII was restored to the throne. The former Charles IV drifted about Europe until 1812, when he finally settled in Rome, in the Palazzo Barberini.Manuel de Godoy#Exile His wife died on 2 January 1819, followed shortly by Charles, who died on 20 January of the same year. Sir Francis Ronalds included a detailed description of the funeral in his travel journal.

Character
Well-meaning and pious, Charles IV floundered in a series of international crises beyond his capacity to handle. He was painted by Francisco Goya in a number of official court portraits, which numerous art critics have seen as satires on the King's stout vacuity.

Marriage and children

Charles IV married his first cousin Maria Louisa, the daughter of Philip, Duke of Parma, in 1765. The couple had fourteen children, seven of whom survived into adulthood:

Ancestors

See also
History of Spain (1700-1810)

References

Further reading
 Barbier, Jacques A. "Peninsular finance and colonial trade: The dilemma of Charles IV's Spain." Journal of Latin American Studies 12.1 (1980): 21–37.
 Gómez de Arteche. Historia del Reinado de Carlos IV, (5 vols.), in the Historia General de España de la Real Academia de la Historia (Madrid, 1892).
 Hamilton, Earl J. "Monetary problems in Spain and Spanish America 1751–1800." The Journal of Economic History 4.1 (1944): 21–48.
 Paquette, Gabriel B. Enlightenment, governance, and reform in Spain and its empire, 1759–1808. New York: Palgrave Macmillan, 2008.
 Russell, Craig H. "Spain in the Enlightenment." The Classical Era. Palgrave Macmillan, London, 1989. 350–367.

External links

 
 
 Historiaantiqua. Isabel II; (Spanish)'' (2008)

 
1748 births
1819 deaths
18th-century Spanish monarchs
19th-century Spanish monarchs
18th-century Navarrese monarchs
19th-century Navarrese monarchs
Princes of Asturias
House of Bourbon (Spain)
People from Portici
Knights of Santiago
Knights of the Golden Fleece of Spain
3
3
3
Neapolitan princes
Sicilian princes
Burials in the Pantheon of Kings at El Escorial
18th-century Roman Catholics
19th-century Roman Catholics
Grand Masters of the Order of the Golden Fleece
Spanish captain generals
Monarchs who abdicated